Danville High School is a public secondary school located in Danville, Alabama, United States; it is part of the Morgan County school system. Its student body consists primarily of the following ethnicities: white, black, and Hispanic.

Athletics

Danville High School offers an interscholastic athletics program with numerous sports including baseball, basketball, football, golf, soccer, softball, and volleyball.

Football first began competing in 1976, and currently competes in region 3A-R7. The Hawks have won region championships four times including 1983, 1991, 1994, and 1995. The Hawks current head coach is Andro Williams and play in Smith-Owens Stadium.

Basketball started in 1929, the Hawks have won two state titles in basketball in 1962-63 have reached the state final four 3 more times 1992-93 and 2005. The Hawks are currently coached by Ben Mastin and play in Wayne Bowling Gymnasium.

References

External links
 Danville High School Webpage
 Alabama High School Football Historical Society
 US News

Public high schools in Alabama
Education in Morgan County, Alabama